Rajiv Bajaj (born 21 December 1966) is an Indian businessman, and the managing director of Bajaj Auto since 2005. He introduced the Pulsar range of motorcycles credited with reviving the fortunes of the ailing company.

India Today magazine ranked him #42nd in their India's 50 Most powerful people of 2017 list.

Early life and education
Rajiv Bajaj completed his schooling from St Ursula High School in Akurdi, Pune. He graduated in first class, with distinction, in Mechanical Engineering from the University of Pune in 1988, and then completed his masters in Manufacturing Systems Engineering, with distinction, from the University of Warwick in 1990.

Career 
He has since worked at Bajaj Auto in the areas of Manufacturing & Supply Chain (1990–95), R&D and Engineering (1995-2000), and Marketing and Sales (2000-2005), and has been its Managing Director since April 2005.

References

Indian business executives
Bajaj Auto executives
Chief executives in the automobile industry
1966 births
Living people
Savitribai Phule Pune University alumni
Businesspeople from Pune
Bajaj family
Alumni of the University of Warwick